Salinas de Garci Mendoza (formerly: Salinas de Thunupa) is a town in the Bolivian Oruro Department. Salar de Coipasa,a  salt lake, is 20 km north-west of Salinas de Garci Mendoza, and 15 km in south-eastern direction is Salar de Uyuni, the world's largest salt pan. Salinas de Garci Mendoza is the endpoint of the road from Chuquichamba via Andamarca and Aroma to Salinas de Garci Mendoza.

Salinas de Garci Mendoza bears the title "Capital of Quinoa" because of the intensive cultivation of the quinoa crop in this area.

See also 
 Ch'iyar Qullu
 Jayu Quta
 Jilarata
 Sallani Yapu

Populated places in Oruro Department